Bactrostoma is a genus of moths belonging to the subfamily Olethreutinae of the family Tortricidae.

Species
Bactrostoma cinis Diakonoff, 1960

See also
List of Tortricidae genera

References

External links
tortricidae.com

Archipini
Tortricidae genera
Moths described in 1960
Taxa named by Alexey Diakonoff